The Army Wounded Warrior Program (AW2) is the official U.S. Army program that assists and advocates for severely wounded, ill or injured Soldiers, Veterans, and their Families and Caregivers, wherever they are located, regardless of military status. Soldiers who qualify for AW2 are assigned to the program as soon as possible after arriving at the Warrior Transition Unit (WTU). AW2 supports these Soldiers and their Families throughout their recovery and transition, even into Veteran status. Through the local, personalized support of AW2 Advocates, AW2 strives to foster the Soldier's independence. There are more than 20,000  severely wounded, ill and injured Soldiers and Veterans currently enrolled in AW2.

Eligility requirements
In order to be considered eligible for entry into AW2, Soldiers must suffer
from wounds, illnesses, or injuries incurred in the line of duty after
September 10, 2001 AND receive or expect to receive at least a 30% rating from the Integrated Disability Evaluation System (IDES) for one of the conditions listed below:
 Blindness or severe loss of vision
 Loss of limb
 Hearing loss or deafness
 Burns or permanent disfigurement
 Paralysis/spinal cord injury
 Traumatic Brain Injury (TBI)
 Fatal and incurable disease with limited life expectancy of one year or less
 Receive a 30 percent IDES (Army) disability rating for any other combat related condition or condition caused by an instrumentality of war, including Post Traumatic Stress Disorder (PTSD) and other Behavioral Health (BH) conditions
 Receive a combined 50 percent IDES (Army) disability rating for any other combat related conditions or conditions caused by an instrumentality of war

At this time there are no exceptions to AW2 entry criteria. However, AW2 is currently evaluating the appeals process.

AW2 Advocates
Upon enrollment in the U.S. Army Wounded Warrior Program (AW2), each Soldier is assigned an AW2 Advocate, who helps the Soldier with the recovery and transition process, fostering the Soldier's independence. Together, AW2 Advocates and AW2 Soldiers collaborate to set goals for the Soldiers' and Families' future.  AW2 Advocates are located at Warrior Transition Units (WTUs), military treatment facilities (MTFs), most Army installations and Department of Veterans Affairs (VA) facilities to provide personalized local support on a wide range of issues and resources.

Warrior Care and Transition Program
The  Army's Warrior Care and Transition Program (WCTP), headquartered in Arlington, Virginia, evaluates and treats wounded, ill and injured Soldiers through a comprehensive, Soldier-centric process of medical care, rehabilitation, professional development and achievement of personal goals. Led by the Army's Warrior Transition Command (WTC), the WCTP serves an essential role, not only in managing the care and recovery of Soldiers evacuated from theater, but also those preparing to deploy and those who have returned from combat that require complex care management to cope with the effects of war and multiple deployments. WTC works to ensure everything possible is done to enable Soldiers to return to duty. WTC also plays an important role in ensuring Reserve Component Soldiers receive the care they require prior to and after deployment to remain mission ready. AW2 is a key program in executing the WCTP. WCTP is a subordinate command of United States Army Medical Command.

Services provided by other military branches
Wounded or disabled Veterans from other branches of service are served through other programs. 
 U.S. Marine Corps: the Marine For Life program and the Wounded Warrior Regiment, which has battalion headquarters on the east and west coasts.
 U.S. Air Force: Air Force Wounded Warrior Program (AFW2) for airmen with certain combat-related injuries.
 U.S. Navy: Safe Harbor provides personalized support and assistance to severely injured sailors and their families.

See also
 Warrior Games (multi-sport event)

References

External links

 Official AW2 Web site
 AW2 Fact Sheets
 U.S. Army Warrior Transition Command Web site
 U.S. Army Integrated Disability Evaluation System Web page
 Veterans Administration schedule for rating disabilities
 FBI

War on terror
United States military support organizations
2004 establishments in the United States
American veterans' organizations
Rehabilitation medicine